Căzănești is a commune located in Mehedinți County, Oltenia, Romania. It is composed of twelve villages: Căzănești, Ercea, Gârbovățu de Sus, Govodarva, Ilovu, Jignița, Păltinișu, Poiana, Roșia, Severinești, Suharu and Valea Coșuștei.

References

Communes in Mehedinți County
Localities in Oltenia